Gerald Mlungisi Mvoko (born 2 May 1959) is a South African businessman and politician serving as the Eastern Cape MEC for Finance, Economic Development and Environmental Affairs since May 2019. He has been a Member of the Eastern Cape Provincial Legislature since February 2018. Mvoko is the deputy provincial chairperson of the African National Congress (ANC). He held two posts in the province's Executive Council before being appointed to his current position.

Early life
Mvoko hails from Somerset East in the Eastern Cape. He studied to be an educator. He worked for the New Education South Africa organisation and formed part of the establishment of the South African Democratic Teachers Union in the 1990s.

Political career
Mvoko was the chair of the ANC Sarah Baartman branch for three terms. He was first elected in 2006 and re-elected in 2012 and 2015. He served two terms as mayor of the Cacadu District Municipality until 2011. During this time, Mvoko was also the CEO of the Cacadu Development Agency. In October 2017, he was elected, the deputy provincial chairperson of the ANC, succeeding Sakhumzi Somyo.

In February 2018, Mvoko and ANC provincial chairperson Oscar Mabuyane were sworn in as Members of the Eastern Cape Provincial Legislature. The provincial ANC structure recommended that he be appointed to the provincial cabinet as the MEC for Finance. Incumbent Premier Phumulo Masualle reshuffled his executive in May 2018, in which he appointed Mvoko as the MEC for Human Settlements. He served until November when Masualle made him the MEC for Education. Mvoko held the post for just over sixth months as newly elected Premier Mabuyane selected him to be the MEC for Finance in May 2019.

On 9 May 2022, Mvoko was re-elected to a second term as the deputy provincial chairperson of the ANC.

Personal life
On 19 June 2020, Mvoko and his wife, Balise, tested positive for COVID-19.

References

External links
Mr Gerald Mlungisi Mvoko – People's Assembly

Living people
1969 births
Xhosa people
People from Sarah Baartman District Municipality
People from the Eastern Cape
Politicians from the Eastern Cape
African National Congress politicians
20th-century South African politicians
21st-century South African politicians